"The World We Live In" is a song by American rock band The Killers, taken from the band's third studio album Day & Age (2008), it was released as the third single in the UK and Europe. In North America and the rest of the world, "A Dustland Fairytale" is the third single.

Music video
The video was directed by Danny Drysdale, who also directed the music video "Human" from the same album.  It was shot in Banff, Alberta, Canada in April 2009 and was premiered on MTV Two on May 15, 2009.

A book in the video titled The Wilder side of Gold and Glitz is taken from a lyric from "Neon Tiger".

TV performances
On May 29, The Killers performed "The World We Live In" on UK TV show Friday Night with Jonathan Ross. They also performed "Human" and an impromptu "Mr. Brightside" and "When You Were Young". Frontman Brandon Flowers was also interviewed.

In July 2009, the song was used by ITV4 in their closing montage of coverage of the Tour de France 2009.

On September 8, 2009, the song was heard in the closing montage of the series premiere of Melrose Place.

Track list
"The World We Live In" - 4:40
"Joy Ride - Night Version" - 7:16 (free download with 7" vinyl)

Chart performance

Release history

References

2009 singles
The Killers songs
Songs written by Brandon Flowers
Songs written by Dave Keuning
Songs written by Ronnie Vannucci Jr.
Songs written by Mark Stoermer
Song recordings produced by Stuart Price
2008 songs
Island Records singles